Manga is a genus of moths of the family Noctuidae described by J. Bowden in 1956.

Species
 Manga basilinea Bowden, 1956
 Manga belophora D. S. Fletcher, 1961
 Manga bisignata Laporte, 1973
 Manga melanodonta (Hampson, 1910)

References

Hadeninae